A capitalization-weighted (or cap-weighted) index, also called a market-value-weighted index is a stock market index whose components are weighted according to the total market value of their outstanding shares.  Every day an individual stock's price changes and thereby changes a stock index's value. The impact that individual stock's price change has on the index is proportional to the company's overall market value (the share price multiplied by the number of outstanding shares), in a capitalization-weighted index. In other types of indices, different ratios are used.

For example, the AMEX Composite Index (XAX) had more than 800 component stocks. The weighting of each stock constantly shifted with changes in the stock's price and the number of shares outstanding. The index fluctuates in line with the price move of the stocks.

Stock market indices are a type of economic index.

Free-float weighting
A common version of capitalization weighting is the free-float weighting. With this method a float factor is assigned to each stock to account for the proportion of outstanding shares that are held by the general public, as opposed to "closely held" shares owned by the government, royalty, or company insiders (see float). For example, if for some stock 15% of shares are closely held, and the other 85% are publicly held, the float factor will be 0.85, by which the company's market capitalization will be multiplied before weighting its value against the rest of the index. In other words, the number of shares used for calculation is the number of shares "floating", rather than outstanding.

An index that is weighted in this manner is said to be "float-adjusted" or "float-weighted", in addition to being cap-weighted. For example, the S&P 500 index is both cap-weighted and float-adjusted.

Historically, in the United States, capitalization-weighted indices tended to use full weighting, i.e., all outstanding shares were included, while float-weighted indexing has been the norm in other countries, perhaps because of large cross-holdings or government ownership. More recently, many of the U.S. indices, such as the S&P 500, have been changed to a float-adjusted weighting which makes their calculation more consistent with non-U.S. indices.

Other types of indices
An index may also be classified according to the method used to determine its price. In a price-weighted index such as the Dow Jones Industrial Average, the price of each component stock is the only consideration when determining the value of the index. Thus, price movement of even a single security will heavily influence the value of the index even though the dollar shift is less significant in a relatively high-value name. In a fundamentally weighted index, stocks are weighted by fundamental factors like sales or book value.

Notable capitalization-weighted indices

 CAC 40
 CNX Nifty
 DAX
 EURO STOXX 50
 FTSE 100 Index
 FTSE techMARK 100
 Hang Seng Index
 IBEX 35
 Indice de Precios y Cotizaciones (IPC)
 KOSPI
 KOSDAQ
 KSE 100 Index
 Kuala Lumpur Composite Index (KLCI)
 MSCI EAFE
 NASDAQ-100
 NASDAQ Composite
 NYSE Composite
 RTS Index
 Russell 2000
 SENSEX
 S&P 500
 S&P/ASX 200
 Standard & Poor's 100 Index (OEX)
 Taiwan Capitalization Weighted Stock Index
 TOPIX
 VN-Index

See also
 Stock market index
 Index (economics) 
 Index fund 
 Index investing
 List of stock market indices
 Fundamental weighting

References

Business terms
Management cybernetics
Stock market indices